Sean Cardona Bernabe (born 1970) is a United States Army lieutenant general who serves as the commanding general of III Armored Corps since October 4, 2022. He most recently served as the commanding general of the 1st Armored Division from September 30, 2020 to July 14, 2022. He previously served as Deputy Commanding General, United States Army Europe from July to September 2020. Bernabe is a 1992 graduate of the United States Military Academy with a Bachelor of Science degree in electrical engineering. He holds a master's degree in military art and science from the School of Advanced Military Studies at the Army Command and General Staff College and a master's degree in national security strategy from the National War College.

References

Date of birth missing (living people)
Place of birth missing (living people)
Living people
United States Military Academy alumni
United States Army Command and General Staff College alumni
National War College alumni
Recipients of the Legion of Merit
United States Army generals
1970 births